Villanueva de los Caballeros es un municipio situado en la provincia de Valladolid, Castilla y León, España. De acuerdo con el censo de 2004 census (INE), el municipio tiene una poblacion de 246 habitantes.

References

Municipalities in the Province of Valladolid